Shankumugham Beach is a beach in Thiruvananthapuram district of Kerala, south India. The beach is on the western side of Thiruvananthapuram (Trivandrum) and is very close to Trivandrum International Airport.

The vast stretch of white sand and the serene atmosphere, away from the crowd in the city, provide all the ingredients for relaxation and for spending an ideal evening.  - The city of the Holy Anantha  India|url=https://trivandrum.nic.in/tourist-place/sankhumugham-beach/|access-date=2020-09-07|language=en-US}}</ref> with eating kiosks and open-air theatre with car parking facilities. Good food can be enjoyed at the Old Coffee House, just across the beach, which is also a vantage point for enjoying the sunset. The beach is not well maintained, with garbage littering the entire area.

Shanghumugham beach is considered as the ‘Arattukadavu’ of Sri Ananthapadmanabhan - The presiding deity of the city. Thousands of Hindus perform ‘Bali Tharpanam’  during special occasions. Shankhumugham is the prime location for Ganesh Nimarjan at the time of Vinayaka Chathurthi.

On the Arattu day at Thiruvananthapuram, images of Lord Padmanabhaswamy, Lord Narasimha, and Lord Krishna are taken in procession to the Laccadive Sea at Shanghumugham beach. His Highness the now-titular Maharaja of Travancore will lead the procession with the royal sword in hand, who will be escorted by members of the royal family, armed guards, temple authorities, mounted police, and officers. After the ceremonial bath at Shanghumugham, images are taken back in procession which marks the conclusion of the festival.

The sculpture of Sagarakanyaka - Mermaid by Kanayi Kunhiraman is an added attraction. This giant statue is more than 35 metres long. The 'Jawaharlal Nehru Park of Traffic signs for children' is situated here, which is helpful for the children to understand the traffic rules while playing in the park. The park also provides cycling facilities for small children.

The military area of Southern Air Command of the Indian Air Force and part of the main airport are situated near Shankumugham Beach.

Veli Tourist Village is near the beach.  Boating facilities are offered at this picnic spot. Speed boats, restaurants and well-landscaped gardens are available.

How to reach
 Nearest city - Thiruvananthapuram - 8 km
 Nearest railway station - Thiruvananthapuram Central and Kochuveli railway station
 Nearest airport - Thiruvananthapuram International Airport
 Nearest bus station - Central Bus Station Thiruvananthapuram

Picture gallery

References

External links

A short YouTube Video narrating things to be visited At Shankumugham beach

Tourist attractions in Thiruvananthapuram
Beaches of Kerala